Suur-Matinkylä (Finnish) or Stor-Mattby (Swedish) is a southern main district of Espoo, a city in Finland.

It contains the districts Henttaa, Matinkylä and Olari.

See also 

 Districts of Espoo

Districts of Espoo